Elbaka is a village in the Veenavanka mandal of Karimnagar district in the Indian state of Telangana.

References

Villages in Karimnagar district